Gunnar Thollander, born 1933, is a Swedish social democratic politician, who between 1982 and 1994, was member of the Parliament of Sweden for the Uppsala County constituency. He was Deputy of the Defence Committee between October 8, 1991 and October 2, 1994.

References

Members of the Riksdag
1933 births
Living people
Place of birth missing (living people)
Date of birth missing (living people)